Jan Balouch (6 June 1952 – 3 August 2012) was a Pakistani boxer. He competed in the men's flyweight event at the 1972 Summer Olympics.

References

1952 births
2012 deaths
Pakistani male boxers
Olympic boxers of Pakistan
Boxers at the 1972 Summer Olympics
Place of birth missing
Boxers at the 1974 Asian Games
Asian Games competitors for Pakistan
Flyweight boxers
Sportspeople from Karachi
20th-century Pakistani people